Akwasi or Kwasí or Kwesi is an Ashanti masculine given name originating from the Ashanti people and their Ashanti day naming system, meaning born on a Sunday. People born on particular days are supposed to exhibit the characteristics or attributes and philosophy, associated with the days. Akwasi has the appellation Bodua or Obueakwan  meaning agility. Thus, males named Akwasi are supposed to be agile by nature.

Origin and Meaning 
In the Akan culture, day names are known to be derived from deities. Akwasi originated from  Koyasi and the Lord of Life Descent deity of the day Sunday.  Males named Akwasi are known to be leaders in society and also known to be "clearer of the way" (obue-akwan). They are very inquisitive and tend to be pulled into a thing of interest.

Male Variants of Akwasi 
Day names in Ghana vary in spelling among the various Akan subgroups.  The name is spelt Akwasi or Kwasi by the Akuapem and Ashanti subgroups while the Fante subgroup spell it as Kwesi.

Female version of Akwasi 
In the Akan culture and other local cultures in Ghana, day names come in pairs for males and females. The variant of the name used for a female child born on Sunday is Akosua.

Notable people with the name 
Most Ghanaian children have their cultural day names in combination with their English or Christian names. Some notable people with such names are:
Akwasi Addai Odike, Ghanaian businessman and politician
Akwasi Afrifa (1936–1979), Ghanaian soldier and politician
Akwasi Antwi (born 1985), Canadian football defensive lineman
Akwasi Asante (born 1992), Dutch footballer playing in England
Akwasi Appiah (born 1960), Ghanaian football coach of the national team
Akwasi Fobi-Edusei (born 1986), English footballer
Akwasi Frimpong (born 1986), Ghanaian-Dutch runner and bobsledder
Akwasi Addo Alfred Kwarteng (born Monday 26 May 1975), UK politician
Akwasi Mensah (born 1986), Dutch former NFL Europe football player
Akwasi Oduro (born 1987), Belgian footballer
Akwasi Oppong Fosu, Ghanaian Member of Parliament
Akwasi Osei-Adjei (born 1949), Ghanaian Minister for Foreign Affairs
Akwasi Owusu-Ansah (born 1988), American football defensive back
Nana Akwasi Asare (born 1986), Ghanaian footballer playing in Belgium

See also
Akwasidae Festival

References

Given names
Ashanti given names
Akan given names
African masculine given names
Akan people